Stargard Gubiński  is a village in the administrative district of Gmina Gubin, within Krosno Odrzańskie County, Lubusz Voivodeship, in western Poland, close to the German border. 
The name Stargard stands for old town, old city, or old fortification. It's a combination of a Slavic term stari (old) and gard (town/city/fortification). The term gard is of Pomeranian origin and survived as such in the Kashubian language.

References

Villages in Krosno Odrzańskie County